Uri Ben-Ari
(1925–2009) was tat aluf (brigadier general) of the Israeli Defence Forces (IDF), diplomat and writer. He was recognized as a driving force under the transformation of the IDF from infantry to armored forces. 

Ben-Ari was born in Schöneberg locality of West Berlin, Germany, as Heinz Benner to a wealthy family of clothes merchant.  When he was at the age of six his mother remarried to a German and died two years later. His father perished in the Holocaust with many of his relatives, but saved his son by sending him to  Mandate Palestine as part of Youth Aliyah before the outbreak of World War II. In 1946 he enlisted in the Palmach and participated in most of Israeli wars.

He served at various command positions, including commander of the Armored Corps after the success during the Suez Crisis and deputy commander of the Southern Command during the Yom Kippur War.

He ended his service as commander of Armored Forces in reserve and was appointed Consul General of Israel in New York (1975–1978).  Also, after the retirement he started writing books about his military service.

He is a recipient of the 1995 Yitzhak Sadeh Prize for Military Literature for his book Follow Me! ("!אחרי", literally "After me!"), a  story of a company commander in the battle for Jerusalem during the 1947–1949 Palestine war.

His novel בטבעת החנק, "Betabat Hahenek" [In a Stranglehold] is based on his memories of a child growing up in Nazi Germany and tells the story of five Jewish boys in Berlin of 1933–1939.

In 1965 he married his third wife, Milka Ben-Ari. Ben-Ari had several children: two from his first marriage, two from the second, and two children of Milka. He was buried in the cemetery of kibbutz Shefayim.

References

1925 births
2009 deaths
Jewish emigrants from Nazi Germany to Mandatory Palestine
Palmach members
Israeli generals
Hebrew-language writers
Israeli writers